"The Loved One" is a song by Australian R&B, rock band The Loved Ones and was released in May 1966 as the debut single ahead of their extended play, The Loved Ones (also known as the Blueberry Hill EP), which appeared in December. The song also featured on their debut long play album, Magic Box, in October 1967. "The Loved One" reached No. 2 on the Australian Top 40 singles charts in 1966.

Background
The Loved Ones were formed in Melbourne in 1965 by Gerry Humphrys, Ian Clyne and Kim Lynch. They had previously been members of a youthful trad jazz band, The Red Onion Jazz Band, in which Humphrys and Lynch had played clarinet and tuba respectively. They recruited drummer Gavin Anderson and ex-Wild Cherries guitarist Rob Lovett. The band were renowned as an exciting, if erratic, live act in a Stones–Animals mould and quickly rose to prominence in the local club and dance scene.

The group's visual impact was heightened by their striking mod stage attire and the band had a strong focal point thanks to the charismatic stage presence, saturnine good looks and growling, blues-influenced baritone voice of Humphrys, who is widely acknowledged as one of Australia's finest male pop-rock vocalists. The Loved Ones were one of the first Australian rock bands to use electric piano as part of their regular stage set-up and their distinctive keyboard-based sound set them apart from most of their contemporaries.

They signed to the In Records label (a subsidiary of W&G Records) early in 1966. They shot to national prominence, scoring a major Australian hit with "The Loved One", which reached No. 2 on the Australian Top 40 singles charts in May. "Ever Lovin' Man", was issued in July and reached No. 9. A reworking of Fats Domino's "Blueberry Hill" appeared on their first extended play, Blueberry Hill, in December—together with the two previous singles. "Sad Dark Eyes" followed in January 1967. Each release captured an emotional intensity and musical inventiveness which marked them out from their peers.

They released an album in 1967 titled Magic Box, a collection of their singles. The Loved Ones split later that year in October, just two years after they were formed. Magic Box is considered a classic recording and to this day in Australia it enjoys cult status and has reportedly never been out-of-print since it was released.

In 2001, "The Loved One" was selected as No. 6 on the Australasian Performing Right Association (APRA)'s list of Top 30 Australian songs of all time.

In 2011, "The Loved One" was on the sound track, and over the opening titles, of the ABC TV drama Paper Giants.

Track listing

Personnel
The Loved Ones' members
 Gavin Anderson – drums
 Ian Clyne – piano
 Gerry Humphrys – vocals
 Rob Lovett – guitar
 Kim Lynch – bass guitar

INXS version 

"The Loved One" was recorded twice by INXS.  The original studio version was issued as a stand-alone single in March 1981, in Australia only.  It reached No. 20 on the national charts, and was later featured on their 1982 compilation album Inxsive.

The band re-recorded the track (in a substantially different arrangement) for their 1987 international hit album Kick.  INXS also frequently performed the song live, and one such version is featured on their 1991 live video, Live Baby Live.

Track listing (original 1981 single)

Releases

References

General
  Note: Archived [on-line] copy has limited functionality.
  Note: [on-line] version established at White Room Electronic Publishing Pty Ltd in 2007 and was expanded from the 2002 edition.
Specific

1966 singles
1981 singles
APRA Award winners
INXS songs
1966 songs